Alfred Henry Bromell (September 19, 1947 – March 18, 2013) was an American novelist, screenwriter, and director.

Career
Bromell joined the crew of NBC police drama Homicide: Life on the Street in 1994. He served as a writer and co-executive producer for the show's third season. He contributed to writing seven episodes for the season. He was promoted to executive producer for the fourth season and wrote a further 17 episodes. He scaled back his involvement with the fifth season and became a consulting producer. He wrote a further two episodes before leaving the crew at the end of the season in 1997. He contributed to a total of 26 episodes as a writer over three seasons with the series. He returned as a co-writer and co-executive producer for the feature-length follow-up Homicide: The Movie in 2000.

He wrote and produced for many television series, including Chicago Hope, Northern Exposure, Homicide: Life on the Street, Brotherhood, Carnivàle, and Rubicon. He was a consulting producer, and later executive producer on the Showtime series Homeland at the time of his death and wrote four episodes: "The Good Soldier", "Representative Brody", "Q&A", and "Broken Hearts". He was awarded a Writers Guild of America Award for "The Good Soldier", and he was posthumously awarded a Primetime Emmy Award for Outstanding Writing for a Drama Series for "Q&A". He shared the Primetime Emmy Award for Outstanding Drama Series and the Golden Globe Award for Best Television Series – Drama with the other producers of Homeland in 2012. He was nominated in the same category at the Emmys for his work on the 1993 TV series I'll Fly Away, for which he was awarded a Writers Guild of America Award for the episode titled "Amazing Grace".

Bromell wrote and directed the feature film Panic (2000), which was nominated for the top prize at the Deauville Film Festival, and tele-movie Last Call (aka Fitzgerald), with Jeremy Irons playing writer F. Scott Fitzgerald.

Bromell co-wrote the pilot of the USA Network TV series Falling Water, which he co-created with Blake Masters.

Personal life
Bromell attended Eaglebrook School (1963) and the United World College of the Atlantic (1964–1966). He graduated from Amherst College in 1970. He won the Houghton Mifflin Literary Award for his first novel, The Slightest Distance. His collection of short stories, I Know Your Heart, Marco Polo, was published by Knopf. Bromell's work has appeared in two O. Henry Award collections.

Bromell's first wife was the screenwriter and director Caroline Thompson. He then married writer Trish Soodik, who died of cancer in January 2009; they had a son, William. His third wife was Sarah.

Bromell died March 18, 2013, of a heart attack, at UCLA Santa Monica hospital at age 65.

Selected bibliography
The Slightest Distance (1974) Houghton Mifflin, 
I Know Your Heart, Marco Polo: Stories (1979) Knopf, 
Follower: A Novel (1983) Simon & Schuster, 
Little America (2002) Vintage,

References

External links

20th-century American novelists
20th-century American male writers
American television writers
Amherst College alumni
Place of birth missing
American male screenwriters
American television producers
21st-century American novelists
Primetime Emmy Award winners
Writers Guild of America Award winners
1947 births
2013 deaths
Showrunners
Novelists from Ohio
American male novelists
American male television writers
American male short story writers
20th-century American short story writers
21st-century American short story writers
People educated at Atlantic College
People educated at a United World College
21st-century American male writers
Screenwriters from Ohio